Metamorphabet is a 2015 interactive video game developed by Vectorpark.

Gameplay 

The player interacts with each letter to proceed through the alphabet. For instance, the letter A grows antlers, becomes an arch, and begins to amble. Then it is replaced by the letter B. The letters and words are read aloud.

Development 

Metamorphabet is an iOS game developed by Patrick Smith. He had previously worked on the 2009 Windosill. Smith designed the game to feel "intuitive" and "as natural as possible" for all users, but also designed to be accessible to young children. The game was in development for three years but only came to fruition when Smith thought of having the letters turn into words. The game was released for iOS devices on February 12, 2015, and for Windows and OS X via Steam on April 29.

Reception 

Metamorphabet won the 2015 Independent Games Festival's Excellence in Visual Art award and was a finalist for the Seumas McNally Grand Prize. It was one of ten Apple Design Award recipients in 2015. Reviewers noted the game's charm and intuitiveness.

Andrew Webster of The Verge wrote that Metamorphabet helps kids learn the alphabet and vocabulary, though the game "isn't educational in the traditional sense", as it does not force the player in one direction. He described the game as "more playful than instructive" and "more of a toy than a textbook", making it a suitable first video game for his two-year-old daughter. Webster thought the gameplay was "charming and intuitive" and "fun ... to watch". Evan Narcisse of Kotaku similarly wrote that the game was the first his four-year-old was allowed to play alone. He noted that she struggled with games like Cut the Rope and Where's My Water, and thought that a game like Flower or Hohokum would be her first, but found Metamorphabet to be sufficiently magical in that it inspired curiosity without being "overly earnest or treacly".

References

External links 

2015 video games
Android (operating system) games
Children's educational video games
Indie video games
IOS games
Single-player video games
Video games developed in the United States
Windows games
MacOS games
Apple Design Awards recipients
Articles containing video clips
Independent Games Festival winners